The eleventh season of The Real Housewives of Beverly Hills, an American reality television series, aired on Bravo from May 19, 2021 to November 3, 2021, and is primarily filmed in Beverly Hills, California.

The season focuses on the personal and professional lives of Kyle Richards, Lisa Rinna, Erika Girardi, Dorit Kemsley, Garcelle Beauvais, Crystal Kung Minkoff and Sutton Stracke. The season consists of 24 episodes.

The seasons executive producers are Andrew Hoegl, Barrie Bernstein, Lisa Shannon, Pam Healy and Andy Cohen.

Production and crew
Alex Baskin, Chris Cullen, Douglas Ross, Greg Stewart, Toni Gallagher, Dave Rupel and Andy Cohen are recognized as the series' executive producers; it is produced and distributed by Evolution Media. Filming began in October 2020 and ended in February 2021.

In November 2020, production on the series halted after crew members tested positive for COVID-19. In December 2020, it was announced production would remain halted after Kyle Richards, Dorit Kemsley and Kathy Hilton had tested positive. Production on the series later resumed after 14-day quarantines and negative tests. 

The reunion was filmed on September 10, 2021.

Cast
In September 2020, Denise Richards and Teddi Mellencamp Arroyave announced they would not be returning for the eleventh season. A month later in October 2020, it was announced that Crystal Kung Minkoff would be joining the show as a housewife. On April 6, 2021, it was announced that Sutton Stracke would be joining the main cast after previously being featured as a friend of the housewives. Kathy Hilton joined as a "friend of the housewives."

 Hilton is seated between her sister, Richards, and Beauvais during her appearance at the reunion.

Episodes

References

2021 American television seasons
Beverly Hills (season 11)